The Bon Marché was a department store in downtown Lowell, Massachusetts extant from 1878 to 1976.

Frederic Mitchell founded a dry goods store in 1878 under the name "This is Mitchell's". His brother Charles Mitchell operated a shoe store. Both stores were located on Merrimack Street. In 1887 Frederick and Charles combined their operation, under the name The Bon Marché.

Of the building that became the Bon Marché store, the small righthand section was built around 1874 (before Bon Marché existed). The large central section was built in 1887 to house the new Bon Marché Dry Goods store. An addition on the lefthand side (matching the original right side building) was constructed in 1927.

In the manner of the day, wares were sold outside on the street. Customers included the workers of the city's many textile mills. The store was located on Merrimack Street in the heart of the commercial district of what was then the prosperous and growing city of Lowell.

Even in its early days, Bon Marché billed itself as the largest department store in New England. Their Rock Bottom Basement Store featured an actual rock, a large glacial erratic which the basement was built around. An anchor of Lowell's mercantile downtown, its fortunes declined with the city as the mills closed. The last day of business was January 10, 1976. The building was taken over by the Jordan Marsh chain, which itself became defunct in 1996; the building now houses the UMass Lowell bookstore and other businesses.

References

American companies established in 1878
1878 establishments in Massachusetts
1976 disestablishments in Massachusetts
Defunct department stores based in Massachusetts
Companies based in Lowell, Massachusetts